Marijan Ćorić (born 6 February 1995) is a Croatian footballer who plays as a goalkeeper for Istra 1961.

Club career

TEC
On 29 April 2020, Ćorić joined Tweede Divisie side TEC and this transfer would become legally effective in July 2020. On 6 September 2020, he made his debut in a 1–2 home defeat against Koninklijke HFC after being named in the starting line-up.

Llapi
On 5 January 2021, Ćorić signed a six-months contract with Football Superleague of Kosovo club Llapi. On 9 February 2021, he made his debut with Llapi in the 2020–21 Kosovar Cup round of 16 against Ballkani after being named in the starting line-up. Four days later, Ćorić made his league debut in a 0–1 away defeat against Drita after being named in the starting line-up.

International career
Ćorić was born in Čapljina, Bosnia and Heregovina and raised in Croatia. He was eligible for Croatia internationally, as well as Bosnia and Herzegovina, his birthplace. From 2011, until 2014, Ćorić has been part of Croatia at youth international level, respectively has been part of the U17 and U19 teams and he with these teams played three matches.

References

External links

1995 births
Living people
People from Čapljina
Association football goalkeepers
Croats of Bosnia and Herzegovina
Croatian footballers
Croatia youth international footballers
Parma Calcio 1913 players
Spezia Calcio players
NK Istra 1961 players
NK Kustošija players
FK Palanga players
SV TEC players
KF Llapi players
Serie C players
Croatian Football League players
A Lyga players
Tweede Divisie players
Football Superleague of Kosovo players
Croatian expatriate footballers
Expatriate footballers in Italy
Croatian expatriate sportspeople in Italy
Expatriate footballers in Lithuania
Croatian expatriate sportspeople in Lithuania
Expatriate footballers in the Netherlands
Croatian expatriate sportspeople in the Netherlands
Expatriate footballers in Kosovo
Croatian expatriate sportspeople in Kosovo